The green-striped brushfinch (Arremon virenticeps) is a species of bird in the family Passerellidae. Until recently, it was placed in the genus Buarremon.

It is endemic to Mexico where its natural habitat is subtropical or tropical moist montane forest.

References

green-striped brushfinch
Endemic birds of Mexico
green-striped brushfinch
green-striped brushfinch
Taxonomy articles created by Polbot
Birds of the Sierra Madre Occidental
Birds of the Trans-Mexican Volcanic Belt